Pittosporum artense is a species of plant in the Pittosporaceae family. It is endemic to New Caledonia.

References

Endemic flora of New Caledonia
artense
Vulnerable plants
Taxonomy articles created by Polbot